"Engineers of the human soul" was a term applied to writers and other cultural workers by Joseph Stalin.

In the Soviet Union 
The phrase was apparently coined by Yury Olesha. Viktor Shklovsky said that Olesha used it in a meeting with Stalin at the home of Maxim Gorky, and it was subsequently used by Stalin, who said «Как метко выразился товарищ Олеша, писатели — инженеры человеческих душ» ("As comrade Olesha aptly expressed himself, writers are engineers of human souls"). 

During his meeting with writers in preparation for the first Congress of the Union of Soviet Writers, Stalin said: "The production of souls is more important than the production of tanks.... And therefore I raise my glass to you, writers, the engineers of the human soul" (Joseph Stalin, "Speech at home of Maxim Gorky", 26 October 1932). It was taken up by Andrei Zhdanov and developed into the idea of Socialist realism.

China 

Deng Xiaoping spoke approvingly of "engineers of the human soul" in the post-Mao era, while also condemning the "Gang of Four". Deng stated:

In 2018, Xi Jinping, general secretary of the Chinese Communist Party, stated that “Teachers are the engineers of the human soul and the inheritors of human civilization. They carry the important task of spreading knowledge, spreading ideas, spreading truth, shaping soul, shaping life, and shaping newcomers. The fundamental task of education must be nurturing capable young people well-prepared to join the socialist cause. Better education and guidance are needed to build the noble ideal of Communism and the common ideal of socialism with Chinese characteristics among the students.”

See also 
 New Soviet man
 Soviet dissidents
 Helmholtz Watson
 Claude Adrien Helvétius
 Nature versus nurture
 General
 Propaganda in the Soviet Union
 Propaganda in China
 Social engineering (political science)

References

Citations

Sources

External links 
 Quotation source
 As applied to Soviet cinema
 Deng's 1979 speech
 Later use by Zhdanov

Social engineering (political science)
Socrealist literature
Soviet phraseology
Communist propaganda
Propaganda in the Soviet Union
Propaganda in China